Events from the year 1729 in Scotland.

Incumbents 

 Secretary of State for Scotland: vacant

Law officers 
 Lord Advocate – Duncan Forbes
 Solicitor General for Scotland – John Sinclair, jointly with Charles Erskine

Judiciary 
 Lord President of the Court of Session – Lord North Berwick
 Lord Justice General – Lord Ilay
 Lord Justice Clerk – Lord Grange

Events 
 8 January – two women arrested in Edinburgh for wearing men's clothing.
 6 August – Royal Infirmary of Edinburgh established as the "Hospital for the Sick Poor" or "Physicians' Hospital" in Edinburgh.
 Mackintosh of Borlum publishes An essay on ways and means for inclosing, fallowing, planting, &c. Scotland; and that in sixteen years at farthest, "by a lover of his country", in Edinburgh.

Births 
 October – Sir William Pulteney, 5th Baronet, born William Johnstone, advocate, landowner and politician (died 1805 in London)
 William Buchan, physician (died 1805 in London)
 John Moore, physician and writer (died 1802 in London)

Deaths 
 21 March – John Law, economist (born 1671; died in Venice)
 13 September – Colen Campbell, architect (born 1676; died in London)
 Gershom Carmichael, philosopher (born c. 1672)
 Sìleas na Ceapaich, Gaelic poet (born c. 1660)

The arts
 Society of St. Luke, Scotland's first art institute, established in Edinburgh.

See also 

 Timeline of Scottish history

References 

 
Years of the 18th century in Scotland
Scotland
1720s in Scotland